S900 may refer to :

 Akai S900, a 1985 12-bit sampler 
 Canon S900, a Canon S Series digital camera
 SuperMac S900, a Macintosh clone from 1996
 Yamaha PSR-S900, a portable keyboard

See also

 900s (disambiguation)
 900 series (disambiguation) including 'series 900'